Reading School District is a large, urban public school district that serves the city of Reading, Pennsylvania. According to 2010 federal census data, it serves a resident population of 88,893. In 2009, the Reading School District residents’ per capita income was $13,086, while the median family income was $31,067. In the Commonwealth, the median family income was $49,501  and the United States median family income was $49,445, in 2010. The district's student demographics reflect the racial diversity of the City of Reading. The city's 88,893 residents include 58% Latino/Hispanic (vs. 37% in 2000), 28% White and 11% Black. In the 2015–2016 school year, the district contained 19,178 students.

Schools

Elementary schools
Students in preschool and kindergarten through grade 4 attend the following schools:

 Amanda E. Stout
 Glenside
 Lauer's Park
 Millmont
 Northwest Area
 Riverside
 Tyson-Schoener
 10th & Green
 10th & Penn
 12th & Marion
 13th & Green
 13th & Union
 16th & Haak

Middle schools
Students in grade 5 through grade 8 attend the following schools:

 Northeast Middle School
 Northwest Middle School
 Southern Middle School
 Southwest Middle School
 Central Middle School

High school
 Reading Senior High School (grades 9-12)

Extracurriculars
The Reading School District offers a wide variety of clubs, activities and an extensive sports program at the high school and 4 middle schools.

Sports
The District funds:

Boys
Baseball - AAAA
Basketball- AAAA
Bowling - AAAA
Cross country - AAA
Football - AAAA
Golf - AAA
Indoor track and field - AAAA
Soccer - AAA
Swimming and diving - AAA
Tennis - AAA
Track and field - AAA
Volleyball - AAA
Water polo - AAAA
Wrestling - AAA

Girls
Basketball - AAAA
Bowling - AAAA
Cheer - AAAA
Cross country - AAA
Field hockey - AAA
Indoor track and field - AAAA
Soccer (Fall) - AAAA
Softball - AAAA
Swimming and diving - AAA
Girls' tennis - AAA
Track and field - AAA
Volleyball - AAA
Water polo - AAAA

Middle school sports:

Boys
Baseball
Basketball
Cross country
Football
Soccer
Track and field
Wrestling	

Girls
Basketball
Cross country
Field hockey
Soccer (Fall)
Softball 
Track and field
Volleyball

References

Reading, Pennsylvania
School districts in Berks County, Pennsylvania